Chulalongkorn Business Academic and Coaching Center (CBAC) is a training and coaching center in Thailand. It was founded in 1995 by Chulalongkorn Business Administration (CBA), as Micro MBA Chula, in order to provide multiple business courses for Thai people. The center offers the following short business courses:
 Micro MBA
 Effective Digital Marketing
 Effective Branding in Action

References

External links 
 Official Website

University departments in Thailand
Chulalongkorn University